The Yujiulü clan (reconstructed Middle Chinese: ʔjuk kjǝu ljwo) was the ruling clan of the Rouran Khaganate, which ruled over Northern China, the Mongolian Steppe and Southern Siberia.

Origin 
According to Book of Wei and History of the Northern Dynasties, the surname Yujiulü is of Donghu origin. The first known Yujiulü was a slave caught by Xianbei mounted raiders under the reign of Tuoba Liwei. The slave, whose hairline started at his eyebrows' level, was called Mùgúlǘ (木骨閭) - "bald-headed" in the Xianbei language. When grown-up, Mugulü was noted for his strength, emancipated and recruited as a cavalry soldier. For tarrying past the deadline, he was sentenced to death by beheading. But he fled to the mountains and ravines in the Gobi desert, where he gathered another 100 fugitives. The fugitives sought refuge under the Gaoche tribe called Hetulin (紇突隣). The descendants of Mugulü and his companions became the nucleus of the future Rouran Khaganate. Alexander Vovin proposes that Mùgúlǘ (木骨閭), in reconstructed Middle Chinese *muwk-kwot-ljo, transcribed Tuoba Xianbei *moqo-lo ~ muqo-lo 'bald head', which is analysable as 'one [who/]which has cut-off/fallen-off [hair]' and cognate with Mongolic lexical items like Written Mongolian moɣutur ~ moqutur 'blunt, hornless, bald tail' (cf. Chinese gloss: 禿尾 'bald tail'), moqu-ɣar, Middle Mongol  'hornless', moqo-dag 'blunt'; all of those are from Proto-Mongolic *muqu 'to be cut off, break off, fall off', which in turn would produce the semantic variation 'blunt ~ hornless ~ hairless ~ bald'.

Later on, his dynasty was called Yujiulü, which sounded like Mugulü. Róna-Tas suggests that Yujiulü renders *ugur(i) > Uğur, a secondary form of Oğur.; Peter B. Golden additionally proposes connection with Turkic uğurluğ "feasible, opportune", later "auspicious fortunate" or oğrï "thief", an etymology more suited to the dynasty's founder's activities; additionally Yujiulü may be comparable to Middle Mongolian uğuli "owl" (> Khakha ууль uul'), as personal names based on bird names are common in Mongolic.

Family tree

Other members 

 Consort Yujiulü (died 452), formally Empress Gong, a consort of Tuoba Huang, a crown prince of the Northern Wei, and the mother of Emperor Wencheng.
 Lü Pi (闾毗) - Duke of Hedong (河东王), d. April 461.
 Yujiulü Ruowen (郁久閭若文) - Prince of Puyang, senior official at court of Emperor Wencheng of Northern Wei.
 Empress Yujiulü (525–540), formally Empress Dao (悼皇后), consort of Emperor Wen of Western Wei.

Dissolution and legacy 
Yujiulü clan lost its dominant power in steppe to Ashina tribe in 555. Surviving members of royal clan sinicized, changing their surnames to Lǘ (闾). Some of them even served Sui dynasty, such as Yujiulü Furen (d. 29 November 586). Chinese author Wang Anyi wrote that her mother Ru Zhijuan might be descended from Rouran.

Genetic

References

 
Rouran
Nomadic groups in Eurasia
History of Mongolia
Inner Asia
Mongolian nobility